Arnold Wall  (15 November 1869 – 29 March 1966) was a New Zealand university professor, philologist, poet, mountaineer, botanist, writer and radio broadcaster.

Early life and education 
He was born in Nuwara Eliya, Ceylon in 1869; his father was George Wall. His daughter Hilary married the adult educator Norman Richmond in 1926. He is the brother of Rowena Seymour, Duchess of Somerset and the uncle of Evelyn Seymour, 17th Duke of Somerset.

He was educated at Harrow School and Christ's College, Cambridge. He left Cambridge in 1897, having written his thesis on Scandinavian elements in English dialects.

Career 
Wall was appointed a Commander of the Order of the British Empire in the 1956 Queen's Birthday Honours, for services to education. He received an honorary doctorate (DSc) from the University of New Zealand in 1960.

References

External links 

1869 births
1966 deaths
People educated at Harrow School
Alumni of Christ's College, Cambridge
New Zealand mountain climbers
20th-century New Zealand botanists
New Zealand poets
New Zealand male poets
New Zealand broadcasters
Sri Lankan emigrants to New Zealand
Academic staff of the University of Canterbury
New Zealand Commanders of the Order of the British Empire

New Zealand people of English descent
Wall family
New Zealand people of Sri Lankan descent